Elisabeth of Mansfeld-Hinterort (1565 – 12 April 1596), was a German noblewoman member of the House of Mansfeld and by marriage Duchess of Saxe-Coburg-Eisenach.

Born in Mansfeld, she was a daughter of John, Count of Mansfeld-Hinterort and his second wife Margaret, a daughter of Ernest I, Duke of Brunswick-Lüneburg.

Life
In Wiener Neustadt on 23 November 1591 Elisabeth married John Ernest, Duke of Saxe-Coburg-Eisenach with his brother. They had one son:

John Frederick, Hereditary Prince of Saxe-Coburg-Eisenach (b. and d. Marksuhl, 8 April 1596).

Four days later, Elisabeth died aged 31, probably from childbirth complications. She was buried in Creuzburg alongside her son.

References

|-

|-

House of Mansfeld
House of Wettin
1565 births
1596 deaths
16th-century German people
Deaths in childbirth